Bhatiyar is a Hindustani classical raga assigned to the Marva thaat.

Theory 
Arohana: 

Avarohana: 

Vadi: 

Samavadi: 

Thaat: Marva.

Pakad or Chalan: S m P D N r' N D m P G r S

M D S', r' N D P, D m P G r S

Or we have other way for Chalan as

S-D-P-D-m-P-G-M-D-S,
r-N-D-P-D-m-P-G-r-s

Time: Early morning, 3–6

Behaviour 
Behaviour refers to practical aspects of the music. It is complicated to talk about this for Hindustani music since many of the concepts are fluid, changing, or archaic. The following information cannot be accurate, but it can attempt to reflect how the music existed.

Notes

References

Sources

External links
SRA on Samay and Ragas
SRA on Ragas and Thaats
Rajan Parrikar on Ragas
Film Songs in Rag Bhatiyar
more details about raag Bhatiyar

Bhatiyar